Mike Smith is an American softball coach. He is the head coach at California Baptist. He was previously the head coach of the Ole Miss Rebels softball team. He was a Western Baseball League Pitcher of the Year with the Mission Viejo (Calif.) team in both 1997 and 1998, and in 2000 was the MVP of the WBL championship series with the St. George team.

Coaching career

Ole Miss
On May 29, 2014, Mike Smith was announced as head coach at Ole Miss.
On December 8, 2019, Smith resigned as head coach of the Ole Miss softball program after being suspended for not meeting university expectations.

Head coaching record

References

Living people
American softball coaches
The Master's Mustangs baseball players
Year of birth missing (living people)
Biola Eagles softball coaches
UC Riverside Highlanders softball coaches
California Baptist Lancers softball coaches
McNeese Cowgirls softball coaches
Ole Miss Rebels softball coaches